Cercosaura steyeri is a species of lizard in the family Gymnophthalmidae. The species is endemic to Argentina.

Etymology
The specific name, steyeri, is in honor of Brazilian herpetologist Ligia Steyer Krause.

Geographic range
C. steyeri is found in Mercedes Department, Corrientes Province, Argentina.

Habitat
The preferred habitat of C. steyeri is savanna, at altitudes of

Reproduction
C. steyeri is oviparous.

References

Further reading
Avila LJ, Martinez LE, Morando M (2013). "Checklist of lizards and amphisbaenians of Argentina: an update". Zootaxa 3616 (3): 201–238. (in English, with an abstract in Spanish).
Tedesco ME (1998). "Una nueva especie de Pantodactylus (Squamata, Gymnophthalmidae) de la provincia de Corrientes, República Argentina". Facena 14: 53–62. (Pantodactylus steyeri, new species). (in Spanish).

Cercosaura
Reptiles of Argentina
Endemic fauna of Argentina
Reptiles described in 1998
Taxa named by María Esther Tedesco